Yuko Moriguchi (born 13 April 1955) is a Japanese professional golfer who played on the LPGA of Japan Tour and the LPGA Tour.

Moriguchi won 41 times on the LPGA of Japan Tour between 1978 and 1994 and one of those events, the 1987 Mazda Japan Classic, was an LPGA Tour co-sanctioned tournament.

Moriguchi won the LPGA qualifying school tournament in January 1981 and played sparingly on the LPGA Tour from 1981 to 1983. Her 1987 win was as a non-member.

Professional wins

LPGA of Japan Tour (41)
1978 (4) World Ladies Golf Tournament, Japan LPGA Championship,  Miyagi TV Cup Ladies Open, Mizuno Golf Tournament 
1979 (2) Saikai National Park Ladies Open, Pioneer Cup
1980 (3) Hiroshima Women's Open, Mizuno Golf Tournament, Isuzu Ladies Cup
1981 (6) Yakult Mirumiru Ladies, Northeast Queens, Kumamoto Chuo Ladies, Junon Women's Open, Mizuno Golf Tournament, JLPGA Lady Borden Cup
1982 (4) Tokushima Tsukinomiya Ladies Open, Junon Women's Open, Northeast Queens, Elleair Ladies Open
1983 (4) Tohato Ladies, Yakult Mirumiru Ladies, Mitsubishi Fanta Database Ladies, Northeast Queens
1985 (5) Mizuno Open, Japan Women's Open, Isuzu Ladies Cup, Miyagi TV Cup Women's Open, JLPGA Lady Borden Cup
1987 (2) Mazda Japan Classic (co-sanctioned with LPGA Tour), JLPGA Lady Borden Cup
1989 (2) Yamaha Cup Ladies Open, an Queens
1990 (2) Japan Women's Open, Miyagi TV Cup Women's Open
1991 (3) Sky Court Ladies, Yakult Mirumiru Ladies, Takara Invitational
1992 (1) Konica Cup World Ladies
1993 (1) Stanley Ladies
1994 (2) Mitsukoshi Cup Ladies Open, Consulting Inc. Ladies

Tournament in bold denotes major championships in LPGA of Japan Tour.

LPGA Tour (1)

References

External links

Japanese female golfers
LPGA of Japan Tour golfers
LPGA Tour golfers
People from Toyama (city)
1955 births
Living people